Panzhihua is a township (乡) located in Yuanyang County, Honghe Prefecture, Yunnan Province in Southwest China.  It is near Xinjie (Old Yuanyang).

Township-level divisions of Honghe Hani and Yi Autonomous Prefecture
Yuanyang County, Yunnan